The 2018-19, UAE Pro League was the 45th edition with Al Ain being the defending champions after winning their 13th title. Both Baniyas and Kalba returned to the pro league after getting relegated back at 2017. After losing Al Shabab and Dubai last season the league has been reduced to 12 teams. Both the teams needed to get back to 14 teams so they held a relegation play off between bottom two teams of last year and the 3rd and 4th placed teams of the 2nd division. Sharjah set a record of the longest unbeaten run in a UAE Pro League season for 23 games before losing to Al Wasl 3–2. In 2019, Sharjah  won their first title since 1996 after beating Al Wahda 3–2, this was the first time a team outside of Dubai and Abu Dhabi won the league since the 1996. On 26th May, Emirates and Dibba Al Fujairah were relegated after a fixed match between Shabab Al Ahli and Fujairah favored Fujairah and got them out of relegation. The Emirates demanded that the UAEFA investigate on the match between Shabab Al Ahli and Fujairah, questioning the legitimacy of the two penalties that was rewarded to Fujairah and the two goals that was disallowed for Shabab Al Ahli. However the UAE court later rejected their complaint and the team got relegated

Team Changes

To Division 1 
Relegated to UAE Division 1
Hatta

From Division 1 
Promoted to UAE Pro League
Baniyas
Kalba
Fujairah

Stadia and locations

Note: Table lists clubs in alphabetical order.

* = 

 Personnel and kits 

Note: Flags indicate national team as has been defined under FIFA eligibility rules. Players may hold more than one non-FIFA nationality.

 Managerial changes 

 Foreign players 
All teams could register as many foreign players as they want, but could only use four on the field each game.

Players name in bold indicates the player is registered during the mid-season transfer window.
Players in italics'' were out of squad or left club within the season, after pre-season transfer window, or in the mid-season transfer window, and at least had one appearance.

League table

Results

Season statistics

Number of teams by Emirates

References

UAE Pro League seasons
1
UAE